Qasem Ravanbakhsh is an Iranian Shia cleric, conservative politician and journalist. He is editor-in-chief of Partow-e Sokhan and a leading member of Front of Islamic Revolution Stability.

Electoral history

References 

Living people
Front of Islamic Revolution Stability politicians
Iranian Shia clerics
Coalition of the Pleasant Scent of Servitude politicians
Iranian city councillors
People from Qom
1958 births